Tryke can refer to:

 A tricycle.
 A slang word for lesbian-identified trans woman (a contraction of transsexual and dyke). A somewhat obscure term, it originated in the 1990s and has, perhaps, fallen into disuse.